Christina Kim (born March 15, 1984) is an American professional golfer currently playing on the LPGA Tour and on the Ladies European Tour (LET). She is known for her animated style of play, flamboyant dress, and outgoing personality.

Kim competed in eight events in 2001 on the Futures Tour and made three cuts and a tied for second once. Shortly after her 18th birthday, Kim turned professional and competed on the 2002 Futures Tour for prize money. Kim missed just one cut in 18 starts with 12 top-ten finishes. She won her first event as a professional in August 2002 - the Hewlett-Packard Garden State FUTURES Summer Classic in a six-hole playoff over future LPGA Tour star Lorena Ochoa. Kim was second to Ochoa on the money list and both earned LPGA Tour cards for 2003.

Kim won the 2004 Longs Drugs Challenge and the 2005 Mitchell Company Tournament of Champions and was a member of three U.S. Solheim Cup teams in 2005, 2009, and 2011. She was the youngest player to reach $1 million in earnings, which she achieved in 2004 at age 20. This record was broken the following year by Paula Creamer.

She joined the Ladies European Tour in 2010 and competed in six events, including two that were co-sanctioned with the LPGA.  She earned her first win on the LET in 2011 at the Sicilian Italian Ladies Open.

Kim's autobiography, Swinging from My Heels: Confessions of an LPGA Star, co-written with Alan Shipnuck was published in 2010.

Professional wins (5)

LPGA Tour (3)

LPGA Tour playoff record (1–1)

Ladies European Tour (1)

Futures Tour (1)

Futures Tour playoff record (1–0)

Results in LPGA majors
Results not in chronological order before 2019.

^ The Evian Championship was added as a major in 2013

CUT = missed the half-way cut
NT = no tournament
T = tied

Summary

Most consecutive cuts made – 6 (2004 Kraft Nabisco – 2005 LPGA)
Longest streak of top-10s – 2 (twice)

LPGA Tour career summary

 Official as of 2022 season
* Includes matchplay and other events without a cut.

LET career summary

includes events co-sanctioned with the LPGA Tour (Evian Masters and Women's British Open)

Futures Tour summary

Team appearances
Professional
Solheim Cup (representing the United States): 2005 (winners), 2009 (winners), 2011
Lexus Cup (representing International team): 2008 (winners)

Solheim Cup record

References

External links

Christina Kim at SeoulSisters.com

American female golfers
LPGA Tour golfers
Solheim Cup competitors for the United States
Golfers from California
Golfers from Orlando, Florida
American sportspeople of Korean descent
Sportspeople from San Jose, California
1984 births
Living people
21st-century American women